Drnava is a village and municipality in the Rožňava District in the Košice Region of eastern Slovakia.

History
In historical records the village was first mentioned in 1364.

Geography
The village lies at an altitude of 382 metres and covers an area of 26.906 km².
It has a population of about 675 people.

Ethnicity
The population is about 72% Magyar and 28% Slovak in ethnicity.

Culture
The village has a small public library, a gymnasium, a football pitch and a food store.

Genealogical resources

The records for genealogical research are available at the state archive "Statny Archiv in Kosice, Slovakia"

 Roman Catholic church records (births/marriages/deaths): 1732-1905 (parish B)

See also
 List of municipalities and towns in Slovakia

External links
https://web.archive.org/web/20071116010355/http://www.statistics.sk/mosmis/eng/run.html
Surnames of living people in Drnava

Villages and municipalities in Rožňava District